Andy Hess (born December 4, 1966) is an American bassist and former member of Gov't Mule, having joined the band in 2003.  Previously, he was The Black Crowes' bassist from February 2001 until their hiatus early the following year.  He has also played in Joan Osborne's band and has done session work for artists including David Byrne and Tina Turner. Hess is currently  touring with Steve Kimock. He performed on The John Scofield's Band albums Up All Night which was released in 2003 and Überjam Deux which was released in 2013.

Notes

External links
Official website

American bass guitarists
The Black Crowes members
Gov't Mule members
1966 births
Living people
Guitarists from Washington, D.C.
American male guitarists
20th-century American guitarists
American male bass guitarists